The Hotel Ansley was a hotel that occupied the south side of Williams Street between Forsyth and Fairlie streets in the Fairlie-Poplar district of Downtown Atlanta. It was built in 1913 by Jerome B. Pound of Chattanooga, TN and named for Edwin P. Ansley, developer of the Ansley Park neighborhood; an estimated 5000 guests attended the opening of the $1,000,000 property. The property was originally managed by M.I. and Frank Harrell.

In 1930 radio station WGST moved its studios to the hotel.

In 1939, the hotel had 400 rooms each with en-suite bathroom and radio.

In 1952 the property was sold to the Dinkler hotel chain (once boasting "3000 Rooms in Southern Hotels") and was renamed the Dinkler Ansley, and later in 1953 (40 years after its construction) renamed again to the Dinkler Plaza Hotel. Hotel Ansley was the second downtown Atlanta hotel purchase for Dinkler Hotels (the first being the Kimball House (Atlanta) Hotel), and it was here that the Dinkler corporate office was based.

On January 30, 1961, 66-year-old Carling Dinkler Sr., then-president of Dinkler Hotels, plunged twelve stories to his death from his personal suite at the Dinkler Plaza Hotel (formerly Hotel Ansley). Fulton County Medical Examiner Dr. Tom Dillon determined the death "was caused from injuries received in a suicidal jump." No note was found. Dinkler Sr. had been ill and depressed following intestinal surgery he had undergone eight months earlier and Dinkler Jr. told Atlanta police that his father had endured "considerable pain of late" and feared a relapse of his sickness. In response to inquiries from the press, a spokesman acknowledged the family was "puzzled" because Dinkler Sr. had been in good spirits the night before. While the events leading to his death appeared to be quite clear, some felt that such a public act of suicide was the last thing to be expected of someone as private and reserved as Dinkler Sr. (whose modest and unassuming nature was evidenced by the fact that he had a chauffeur, but rode in a Chevrolet).The abrupt death of its president came at a time when Dinkler Hotels was planning to merge with New York-based Associated Hotels Corporation. Dinkler holdings included the Dinkler Plaza, the Tutwiler and the Andrew Jackson hotels as well as the Dinkler-Belvedere Motor Inn and the Belvedere Ice Rink in Decatur, Georgia. Dinkler Sr. owned a hobby farm in Decatur, an Atlanta suburb just minutes from Emory University, and his ice rink was reportedly the first to be constructed in the entire metropolitan Atlanta area. Upon his father's death, Carling Dinkler Jr. became president of Dinkler Hotels.

In 1964 The city of Atlanta presented civil rights leader Dr. Martin Luther King Jr. with an historic congratulatory banquet, Atlanta's first biracial formal dinner, in the hotel's magnificent chandeliered ballroom upon his receiving the Nobel Peace Prize that year.

The hotel was razed in 1972<ref>"Dinkler Hotels", '"Southern Edition'']</ref> and the acre of land on which the hotel had been located was sold for a reported $7.7 million in 1988.

 See also 

 Hotels in Atlanta

References

External links
Photos of Hotel Ansley at Atlanta History Center'' site: [https://archive.today/20130117205554/http://album.atlantahistorycenter.com/store/Products/79602-forsyth-building-hotel-ansley.aspx

External links 

Hotel buildings completed in 1913
Demolished hotels in Atlanta
Dinkler hotels
1913 establishments in Georgia (U.S. state)
Buildings and structures demolished in 1972